The 1925 Copa de Competencia Jockey Club was the final that decided the champion of the 15° edition of this National cup of Argentina. In the match, held in Boca Juniors stadium (on Brandsen and Del Crucero) on April 25, 1926, Boca Juniors defeated Argentinos Juniors 1–0 in playoff, after the original match had ended 1–1.

Qualified teams 

Note

Overview 
The 1925 edition was contested by 23 clubs, all within Buenos Aires Province with no teams from Liga Rosarina de Football participating in the competition. Boca Juniors reached the final after eliminating Porteño (1–0), Alvear (8–0), Nueva Chicago (2–0), and El Porvenir (3–1 in semifinal).

On the other side, Argentinos Juniors earned its right to play the final after eliminating Argentino de Banfield (2–0), Huracán (4–2), and Temperley (1–1, 1–0 in playoff).

The final was held in Boca Juniors stadium on Brandsen and Del Crucero (where La Bombonera is nowadays) on April 18, 1926. Forward héctor Rivas scored the first goal for Argentinos Juniors, but 5 minutes later, on 70', Domingo Tarasconi tied the match, which ended 1–1. With no extra time played, a playoff match was scheduled for April 25 at the same venue. Boca Juniors won with goal by Alfredo Garasini on 7 minutes, crowning champion.

Match details

Final

Playoff

References

j
1925 in Argentine football
1925 in South American football
Football in Buenos Aires